Argyle is an unincorporated community in San Juan County, in the U.S. state of Washington.

History
A post office called Argyle was established in 1886, and remained in operation until 1912. In 1887, the Postmaster was Robert Lyall with yearly salary of $77.80 The origin of the name Argyle is uncertain.

References

Unincorporated communities in San Juan County, Washington
Unincorporated communities in Washington (state)